The 11th Grand Prix de l'Albigeois was a Formula One motor race held on 10 July 1949. The race was preceded by a 5 lap heat, which determined the grid positions for the 34 lap final.

The winner was Juan Manuel Fangio in a Maserati 4CLT; he also won the heat and set fastest lap. B. Bira finished second in another 4CLT and Louis Rosier came in third in a Talbot-Lago T26C.

Results

Heat

Final

References

Albi Grand Prix
1949 in French motorsport
Motorsport in France